Huffstutler Springs, is a spring, located near the channel of Devils River (Texas) at an elevation of 1489 feet,  south of Texas State Highway 163 at Bakers Crossing bridge in Val Verde County, Texas.

History
Huffstutler Springs was an important location for Native Americans along Devils River for over 9,000 years.  Camp Hudson was located nearby from 1857 to 1877.

Today
The springs are obscured by grass and cane, but can be seen from the river.  The private ranch on which the spring is located, is trying to preserve its natural state, and so discourages visitors.

References

Springs of Texas
Bodies of water of Val Verde County, Texas
Devils River (Texas)